Neary is a surname. Notable people with this surname include:

 Aaron Neary (born 1992), American American football player
 Alcott Neary (1892–1941), American American football and basketball player and coach
 Aoife Neary (born 1985), Irish camogie player
 Frank Neary (1921–2004), English football player
 J. Peter Neary (1950-2021), Irish economist
 Jo Neary, British comedian, writer and actress
 John Neary, American engineer
 Liz Neary (born 1951), Irish sportsperson
 Lynn Neary, American radio journalist
 Martin Neary (born 1940), English organist and choral conductor
 Michael Neary (bishop) (born 1946), Irish Catholic prelate
 Michael Neary (surgeon), Irish struck-off doctor
 Mike Neary (born 1948), Canadian rower
 Paddy Neary (born 1956), Irish hurler and referee
 Pamela Neary, American politician
 Patricia Neary (born 1942), American ballerina
 Patrick Neary (regulator)
 Patrick Neary (born 1963), American Catholic bishop elect
 Paul Neary (born 1949), British comic book artist
 Shay Neary, American fashion model
 Shea Neary (born 1968), British boxer
 Stephen M. Neary, American military officer
 Steve Neary (1925–1996), Canadian politician
 Tony Neary (born 1948), English rugby union player